Gerola Alta (Geröla in lombard) is a comune (municipality) in the Province of Sondrio in the Italian region Lombardy, located about  northeast of Milan and about  southwest of Sondrio.

References

Cities and towns in Lombardy